Lazaros Orfanidis (born 10 March 1995) is a Greek professional footballer who plays as a right-back.

Personal life
Orfanidis' younger brother, Petros, is also a professional footballer.

References

1995 births
Living people
Greek footballers
Super League Greece players
Football League (Greece) players
Gamma Ethniki players
Xanthi F.C. players
A.P.S. Zakynthos players
Panserraikos F.C. players
Aiginiakos F.C. players
Kavala F.C. players
Association football defenders
Footballers from Xanthi